Okemo State Forest covers  in Andover, Ludlow, Mount Holly and Weston, Vermont in Windsor and Rutland Counties. Okemo Mountain Resort is located in the forest. The forest is managed by the Vermont Department of Forests, Parks, and Recreation. 

Activities in the forest include hiking, biking, cross country skiing, snowmobiling and hunting. Portions of the forest are open to primitive camping. Access is both by state and town road as well as state forest highways (4WD gravel roads).

Okemo State Forest is home to the 798-acre Terrible Mountain Natural Area.

References

External links
Official website

Vermont state forests
Protected areas of Windsor County, Vermont
Protected areas of Rutland County, Vermont
Ludlow (town), Vermont
Mount Holly, Vermont
Weston, Vermont